Park Young-Chul (born April 14, 1954) is a Korean former judoka who competed in the 1976 Summer Olympics.

References

1954 births
Living people
Olympic judoka of South Korea
Judoka at the 1976 Summer Olympics
Olympic bronze medalists for South Korea
Olympic medalists in judo
South Korean male judoka
Medalists at the 1976 Summer Olympics
20th-century South Korean people